The 2022–23 Atlanta Hawks season is the 74th season of the franchise in the National Basketball Association (NBA) and 55th in Atlanta. On February 21, 2023, the Hawks fired Nate McMillan, who spent three seasons with the team. Joe Prunty was named the interim head coach until Quin Snyder was hired.

Draft

The Hawks entered the draft holding one first round pick and one second round pick. On draft night they traded the 44th pick (Ryan Rollins) to the Golden State Warriors in exchange for the 51st pick (Tyrese Martin) and cash considerations ($2,000,000).

Roster

Standings

Division

Conference

Game log

Preseason

|-style="background:#ccffcc;"
| 1
| October 6
| Milwaukee
| 
| Dejounte Murray (25)
| Dejounte Murray (8)
| Dejounte Murray (9)
| Etihad Arena11,449
| 1–0
|-style="background:#ccffcc;"
| 2
| October 8
| @ Milwaukee
| 
| Trae Young (31)
| Clint Capela (8)
| Trae Young (6)
| Etihad Arena11,563
| 2–0
|-style="background:#fcc;"
| 3
| October 12
| @ Cleveland
| 
| Dejounte Murray (17)
| Clint Capela (15)
| Trae Young (6)
| Rocket Mortgage FieldHouse13,072
| 2–1
|-style="background:#fcc;"
| 4
| October 14
| @ New Orleans
| 
| Dejounte Murray (18)
| Jalen Johnson (9)
| Trae Young (7)
| Legacy Arena12,787
| 2–2

Regular season

|-style="background:#cfc;
| 1
| October 19
| Houston
| 
| John Collins (21)
| Onyeka Okongwu (9)
| Trae Young (13)
| State Farm Arena17,878
| 1–0
|- style="background:#cfc;"
| 2
| October 21
| Orlando
| 
| Trae Young (25)
| John Collins (13)
| Trae Young (13)
| State Farm Arena17,822
| 2–0
|- style="background:#fcc;"
| 3
| October 23
| Charlotte
| 
| Trae Young (28)
| Capela, Collins (10)
| Trae Young (9)
| State Farm Arena17,383
| 2–1
|-style="background:#cfc;"
| 4
| October 26
| @ Detroit
| 
| Trae Young (35)
| John Collins (11)
| Dejounte Murray (8)
| Little Caesars Arena17,987
| 3–1
|-style="background:#cfc;"
| 5
| October 28
| @ Detroit
| 
| Trae Young (36)
| Clint Capela (11)
| Trae Young (12)
| Little Caesars Arena18,923
| 4–1
|-style="background:#fcc;"
| 6
| October 29
| @ Milwaukee
| 
| Trae Young (42)
| Clint Capela (10)
| Dejounte Murray (6)
| Fiserv Forum17,341
| 4–2
|- style="background:#fcc;"
| 7
| October 31
| @ Toronto
| 
| Dejounte Murray (20)
| John Collins (12)
| Trae Young (10)
| Scotiabank Arena19,800
| 4–3

|- style="background:#cfc;"
| 8
| November 2
| @ New York
| 
| Dejounte Murray (36)
| John Collins (13)
| Dejounte Murray (9)
| Madison Square Garden19,812
| 5–3
|- style="background:#cfc;"
| 9
| November 5
| New Orleans
| 
| Trae Young (34)
| Clint Capela (19)
| Dejounte Murray (11)
| State Farm Arena17,654
| 6–3
|- style="background:#cfc;"
| 10
| November 7
| Milwaukee
| 
| Dejounte Murray (25)
| Clint Capela (12)
| Dejounte Murray (11)
| State Farm Arena17,494
| 7–3
|- style="background:#fcc;"
| 11
| November 9
| Utah
| 
| Dejounte Murray (26)
| Clint Capela (19)
| Trae Young (9)
| State Farm Arena15,845
| 7–4
|- style="background:#cfc;"
| 12
| November 10
| Philadelphia
| 
| Trae Young (26)
| Clint Capela (20)
| Dejounte Murray (8)
| State Farm Arena16,066
| 8–4
|-style="background:#fcc;"
| 13
| November 12
| @ Philadelphia
| 
| Trae Young (27)
| Clint Capela (15)
| Trae Young (11)
| Wells Fargo Center20,245
| 8–5
|- style="background:#cfc;"
| 14
| November 14
| @ Milwaukee
| 
| De'Andre Hunter (24)
| Clint Capela (10)
| Trae Young (9)
| Fiserv Forum17,341
| 9–5
|- style="background:#fcc;"
| 15
| November 16
| Boston
| 
| Trae Young (27)
| Onyeka Okongwu (9)
| Trae Young (9)
| State Farm Arena18,165
| 9–6
|-style="background:#cfc;"
| 16
| November 19
| Toronto
| 
| Trae Young (33)
| Clint Capela (14)
| Trae Young (12)
| State Farm Arena18,051
| 10–6
|-style="background:#fcc;"
| 17
| November 21
| @ Cleveland
| 
| Trae Young (25)
| Clint Capela (12)
| Trae Young (10)
| Rocket Mortgage FieldHouse19,432
| 10–7
|-style="background:#cfc;"
| 18
| November 23
| Sacramento
| 
| Trae Young (35)
| Clint Capela (14)
| Trae Young (7)
| State Farm Arena18,173
| 11–7
|-style="background:#fcc;"
| 19
| November 25
| @ Houston
| 
| Trae Young (44)
| Onyeka Okongwu (11)
| Trae Young (5)
| Toyota Center16,669
| 11–8
|-style="background:#fcc;"
| 20
| November 25
| Miami
| 
| John Collins (23)
| John Collins (14)
| Trae Young (14)
| State Farm Arena17,268
| 11–9
|-style="background:#fcc;"
| 21
| November 28
| @ Philadelphia
| 
| Hunter, Young (18)
| Clint Capela (16)
| Trae Young (10)
| Wells Fargo Center19,778
| 11–10
|- style="background:#cfc;"
| 22
| November 30
| @ Orlando
| 
| Trae Young (30)
| Capela, Culver (12)
| Trae Young (14)
| Amway Center15,344
| 12–10

|- style="background:#cfc;"
| 23
| December 2
| Denver
| 
| Dejounte Murray (34)
| Clint Capela (11)
| Dejounte Murray (8)
| State Farm Arena16,974
| 13–10
|- style="background:#fcc;"
| 24
| December 5
| Oklahoma City
| 
| Dejounte Murray (24)
| Clint Capela (16)
| Trae Young (10)
| State Farm Arena16,301
| 13–11
|- style="background:#fcc;"
| 25
| December 7
| @ New York
| 
| Trae Young (19)
| Clint Capela (11)
| Trae Young (6)
| Madison Square Garden18,091
| 13–12
|- style="background:#fcc;"
| 26
| December 9
| @ Brooklyn
| 
| Trae Young (33)
| Clint Capela (11)
| Trae Young (9)
| Barclays Center18,072
| 13–13
|- style="background:#cfc;"
| 27
| December 11
| Chicago
| 
| Bogdan Bogdanović (28)
| Clint Capela (14)
| Trae Young (14)
| State Farm Arena17,227
| 14–13
|-style="background:#fcc;"
| 28
| December 12
| @ Memphis
| 
| De'Andre Hunter (19)
| Onyeka Okongwu (10)
| Aaron Holiday (6)
| FedExForum16,544
| 14–14
|-style="background:#fcc;"
| 29
| December 14
| @ Orlando
| 
| De'Andre Hunter (25)
| Onyeka Okongwu (11)
| Trae Young (16)
| Amway Center16,002
| 14–15
|-style="background:#cfc;"
| 30
| December 16
| @ Charlotte
| 
| Trae Young (31)
| Bogdan Bogdanović (9)
| Trae Young (9)
| Spectrum Center17,772
| 15–15
|-style="background:#cfc;"
| 31
| December 19
| Orlando
| 
| Trae Young (37)
| Onyeka Okongwu (8)
| Trae Young (13)
| State Farm Arena17,809
| 16–15
|-style="background:#fcc;"
| 32
| December 21
| Chicago
| 
| Trae Young (34)
| Onyeka Okongwu (11)
| Dejounte Murray (10)
| State Farm Arena17,226
| 16–16
|-style="background:#cfc;"
| 33
| December 23
| Detroit
| 
| Murray, Young (26)
| John Collins (12)
| Trae Young (13)
| State Farm Arena17,028
| 17–16
|-style="background:#fcc;"
| 34
| December 27
| @ Indiana
| 
| John Collins (26)
| John Collins (10)
| Trae Young (10)
| Gainbridge Fieldhouse17,028
| 17–17
|-style="background:#fcc;"
| 35
| December 28
| Brooklyn
| 
| Dejounte Murray (24)
| Onyeka Okongwu (13)
| Dejounte Murray (8)
| State Farm Arena18,030
| 17–18
|-style="background:#fcc;"
| 36
| December 30
| L.A. Lakers
| 
| Trae Young (29)
| John Collins (9)
| Dejounte Murray (9)
| State Farm Arena17,984
| 17–19

|-style="background:#fcc;"
| 37
| January 2
| @ Golden State
| 
| Trae Young (30)
| John Collins (13)
| Trae Young (14)
| Chase Center18,064
| 17–20
|-style="background:#cfc;"
| 38
| January 4
| @ Sacramento
| 
| Collins, Hunter (22)
| John Collins (12)
| Trae Young (6)
| Golden 1 Center17,611
| 18–20
|-style="background:#fcc;"
| 39
| January 6
| @ L.A. Lakers
| 
| Trae Young (32)
| Collins, Hunter (8)
| Trae Young (9)
| Crypto.com Arena18,997
| 18–21
|-style="background:#cfc;"
| 40
| January 8
| @ L.A. Clippers
| 
| Trae Young (30)
| Collins, Okongwu (9)
| Trae Young (8)
| Crypto.com Arena19,068
| 19–21
|-style="background:#fcc;"
| 41
| January 11
| Milwaukee
| 
| Bogdan Bogdanović (22)
| Hunter, Okongwu (9)
| Bogdanović, Murray, Okongwu (5)
| State Farm Arena17,154
| 19–22
|-style="background:#cfc;"
| 42
| January 13
| @ Indiana
| 
| Trae Young (26)
| Onyeka Okongwu (20)
| Trae Young (11)
| Gainbridge Fieldhouse16,071
| 20–22
|-style="background:#cfc;"
| 43
| January 14
| @ Toronto
| 
| Trae Young (29)
| Onyeka Okongwu (13)
| Trae Young (9)
| Scotiabank Arena19,800
| 21–22
|-style="background:#cfc;"
| 44
| January 16
| Miami
| 
| Dejounte Murray (28)
| Clint Capela (6)
| Trae Young (8)
| State Farm Arena18,007
| 22–22
|-style="background:#cfc;"
| 45
| January 18
| @ Dallas
| 
| Dejounte Murray (30)
| Dejounte Murray (7)
| Trae Young (12)
| American Airlines Center20,125
| 23–22
|-style="background:#cfc;"
| 46
| January 20
| New York
| 
| Dejounte Murray (29)
| Capela, Collins (9)
| Dejounte Murray (12)
| State Farm Arena17,711
| 24–22
|-style="background:#fcc;"
| 47
| January 21
| @ Charlotte
| 
| Dejounte Murray (26)
| Clint Capela (9)
| Trae Young (12)
| State Farm Arena17,928
| 24–23
|-style="background:#fcc;"
| 48
| January 23
| @ Chicago
| 
| Trae Young (21)
| Clint Capela (12)
| Trae Young (12)
| United Center20,938
| 24–24
|-style="background:#cfc;"
| 49
| January 25
| @ Oklahoma City
| 
| Trae Young (33)
| Capela, Collins (10)
| Trae Young (11)
| Paycom Center15,079
| 25–24
|-style="background:#fcc;"
| 50
| January 28
| L.A. Clippers
| 
| Trae Young (31)
| Clint Capela (13)
| Trae Young (10)
| State Farm Arena18,448
| 25–25
|-style="background:#fcc;"
| 51
| January 30
| @ Portland
| 
| Dejounte Murray (40)
| Clint Capela (15)
| Bogdanović, Murray (7)
| Paycom Center15,079
| 25–26

|-style="background:#cfc;"
| 52
| February 1
| @ Phoenix
| 
| Dejounte Murray (21)
| Jalen Johnson (11)
| Trae Young (12)
| Footprint Center17,071
| 26–26
|-style="background:#cfc;"
| 53
| February 3
| @ Utah
| 
| Trae Young (27)
| Clint Capela (13)
| Dejounte Murray (8)
| Vivint Arena18,206
| 27–26
|-style="background:#fcc;"
| 54
| February 4
| @ Denver
| 
| Dejounte Murray (28)
| Clint Capela (11)
| Dejounte Murray (10)
| Ball Arena 19,630
| 27–27
|-style="background:#fcc;"
| 55
| February 7
| @ New Orleans
| 
| Bogdan Bogdanović (22)
| Clint Capela (8)
| Trae Young (16)
| Smoothie King Center 16,669
| 27–28
|-style="background:#cfc;"
| 56
| February 9
| Phoenix
| 
| Trae Young (36)
| Clint Capela (17)
| Trae Young (12)
| State Farm Arena17,003
| 28–28
|-style="background:#cfc;"
| 57
| February 11
| San Antonio
| 
| Hunter, Young (24)
| Clint Capela (12)
| Trae Young (17)
| State Farm Arena17,875
| 29–28
|-style="background:#fcc;"
| 58
| February 13
| @ Charlotte
| 
| Trae Young (25)
| Capela, Hunter, Okongwu (7)
| Trae Young (14)
| Spectrum Center 14,078
| 29–29
|-style="background:#fcc;"
| 59
| February 15
| New York
| 
| De'Andre Hunter (20)
| Clint Capela (8)
| Trae Young (11)
| State Farm Arena17,771
| 29–30
|-style="background:#cfc;"
| 60
| February 24
| Cleveland
| 
| Trae Young (34)
| Onyeka Okongwu (11)
| Trae Young (9)
| State Farm Arena18,065
| 30–30
|-style="background:#cfc;"
| 61
| February 26
| Brooklyn
| 
| Trae Young (34)
| Clint Capela (12)
| Trae Young (8)
| State Farm Arena16,983
| 31–30
|-style="background:#fcc;"
| 62
| February 28
| Washington
| 
| Trae Young (31)
| Clint Capela (15)
| Trae Young (7)
| State Farm Arena17,395
| 31–31

|-style="background:#cfc;"
| 63
| March 3
| Portland
| 
| Dejounte Murray (41)
| Clint Capela (12)
| Trae Young (11)
| State Farm Arena17,521
| 32–31
|-style="background:#fcc;"
| 64
| March 4
| @ Miami
| 
| Saddiq Bey (22)
| Clint Capela (13)
| Trae Young (10)
| Miami-Dade Arena19,600
| 32–32
|-style="background:#fcc;"
| 65
| March 6
| @ Miami
| 
| Trae Young (25)
| Clint Capela (10)
| Dejounte Murray (8)
| Miami-Dade Arena19,600
| 32–33
|-style="background:#cfc;"
| 66
| March 8
| @ Washington
| 
| Trae Young (28)
| Bogdan Bogdanović (8)
| Trae Young (10)
| Capital One Arena15,087
| 33–33
|-style="background:#cfc;"
| 67
| March 10
| @ Washington
| 
| Trae Young (28)
| Clint Capela (10)
| Trae Young (9)
| Capital One Arena18,161
| 34–33
|-style="background:#fcc;"
| 68
| March 11
| Boston
| 
| Trae Young (35)
| Capela, Collins (9)
| Trae Young (13)
| State Farm Arena17,884
| 34–34
|-style="background:#fcc;"
| 69
| March 13
| Minnesota
| 
| Trae Young (41)
| Onyeka Okongwu (14)
| Trae Young (7)
| State Farm Arena17,799
| 34–35
|-style="background:#cfc;"
| 70
| March 17
| Golden State
| 
| Trae Young (25)
| Clint Capela (9)
| Trae Young (12)
| State Farm Arena18,201
| 35–35
|-style="background:#fcc;"
| 71
| March 19
| @ San Antonio
| 
| Dejounte Murray (22)
| Clint Capela (12)
| Dejounte Murray (8)
| AT&T Center16,311
| 35–36
|-
| 72
| March 21
| Detroit
|
|
|
|
| State Farm Arena
| 
|-
| 73
| March 22
| @ Minnesota
|
|
|
|
| Target Center
| 
|-
| 74
| March 25
| Indiana
|
|
|
|
| State Farm Arena
| 
|-
| 75
| March 26
| Memphis
|
|
|
|
| State Farm Arena
| 
|-
| 76
| March 28
| Cleveland
|
|
|
|
| State Farm Arena
| 
|-
| 77
| March 31
| @ Brooklyn
|
|
|
|
| Barclays Center
| 
|-

Transactions

Trades

Free agents

Additions

Subtractions

References

 

 

Atlanta Hawks seasons
Atlanta Hawks
Atlanta Hawks
Atlanta Hawks